The ANAPROF 1999–2000 season was the twelfth season since its establishment. It began on August 1, 1999, and ended on January 30, 2000. 10 teams competed in the league, 9 of which returned from the previous season and 1 of which was promoted from Primera A.

Tauro were crowned champions after defeating Plaza Amador 2-0 in the Rommel Fernández becoming Tauro's fifth title in its history. After clinching this title Tauro earned the Panama 1 spot in the 2001 season of the Copa Interclubes UNCAF while Plaza Amador earned the Panama 2 spot as the runner-up.

Previous to the start of the season there was a championship that went on from April to July amongst the participating teams to determine who would play in the 2000 season of the Copa Interclubes UNCAF; the 1999–2000 Campeonato Apertura. Panamá Viejo was crowned champion on July 2 after defeating Tauro 2-0.

Teams

Standings

Results

Final round

Hexagonal

Semifinals

Semifinals
Semifinal 1

Semifinal 2

Note: The Semifinal 2 game between Tauro-Árabe Unido was originally played on January 23 at 1:30 PM (UTC-5) but was suspended after the end of the first half of extra time after a group of Árabe Unido's fans invaded the field, Tauro was leading the scoreboard 3-1 at the time. The two periods of extra time were replayed the next day.

Final

Top goal scorer

Local derby statistics
El Super Clasico Nacional - Tauro v Plaza Amador

References

RSSSF ANAPROF 1999-2000 season

ANAPROF seasons
1999–2000 in Panamanian football
Pan